Miss Venezuela 2010 was the 57th edition of the Miss Venezuela pageant held on October 28, 2010 at the Palacio de Eventos de Venezuela in Maracaibo, Venezuela. At the end of the event, outgoing titleholder Marelisa Gibson crowned Vanessa Gonçalves of Miranda as her successor.

Results 
Color key

Special Awards

Official Contestants
28 candidates competed for the title.

Contestants Notes 

Vanessa Gonçalves placed as semifinalist (Top 16) in Miss Universe 2011 in São Paulo, Brazil.
Ivian Sarcos was crowned Miss World 2011 in London, United Kingdom, becoming the sixth Venezuelan to get the title.
Jessica Barboza placed as 1st runner-up in Miss International 2011 in Chengdu, China.
Caroline Medina placed as 3rd runner-up (Miss Earth Fire) in Miss Earth 2011 in Quezon City, Philippines. She previously won Reina Hispanoamericana 2010 in Bolivia.
Angela Ruiz placed as Virreina (2nd place) in Reinado Internacional del Café 2011 in Colombia. Later, she placed as 5th runner-up in Reina Hispanoamericana 2011 in Bolivia.
Karen Soto won Miss World Next Top Model 2011 in Beirut, Lebanon. She also won Miss Venezuela Mundo 2013 but unplaced in Miss World 2013 in Bali, Indonesia.
Axel López (Dependencias Federales) placed as 1st runner-up in Miss Caraibes Hibiscus 2010 in Saint Martin. Later, she placed at the same position in Reina Mundial del Banano 2014 in Ecuador.
Angela La Padula (Bolívar) placed as 3rd runner-up in Miss Italia Nel Mondo 2011 in Italy.
Adriana Kuper (Sucre) unplaced in Reina Hispanoamericana 2012 in Bolivia.

Gala de la Belleza (Beauty Gala) 
This preliminary event took place on October 16, 2010 at the Estudio 1 de Venevisión, hosted by Leonardo Villalobos. The following awards were given:

External links
Miss Venezuela Official Website

Miss Venezuela
2010 beauty pageants
2010 in Venezuela